The Men's keirin at the 2006 Commonwealth Games in Melbourne, Australia took place on March 17, 2006 at the Melbourne Multi Purpose Venue.

The gold medal was won by Ryan Bayley of Australia.

Results

First round

Heat 1

Heat 2

Heat 3

Repechages

Heat 1

Heat 2

Second round

Heat 1

Heat 2

Finals

1st to 6th

7th to 12th

References

Track cycling at the 2006 Commonwealth Games
Cycling at the Commonwealth Games – Men's keirin